The María Dávila Semidey School, at 300 Muñoz Rivera St., Patillas, Puerto Rico. The school was designed by Architect Francisco Gardón Vega. The school building was designed in the Mission Spanish Revival style and built in 1925. It was added to the United States National Register of Historic Places on November 14, 2012.

References

School buildings on the National Register of Historic Places in Puerto Rico
1925 establishments in Puerto Rico
School buildings completed in 1925
Mission Revival architecture in Puerto Rico
Spanish Revival architecture in Puerto Rico
Patillas, Puerto Rico